William James Wilde (15 May 1892 – 10 March 1969) was a Welsh professional boxer who competed from 1911 to 1923. He held the IBU world flyweight title in 1916, the EBU European flyweight title twice; firstly in 1914 and again from 1916 to 1917, the BBBofC British flyweight title in 1916 and the National Sporting Club's British flyweight title from 1916 to 1918. Often regarded as the greatest British fighter of all time, he was the first official world flyweight champion and was rated by American boxing writer Nat Fleischer, as well as many other professionals and fans including former boxer, trainer, manager and promoter, Charley 'Broadway' Rose, as "the Greatest Flyweight Boxer Ever". Wilde earned various nicknames such as, "The Mighty Atom," "Ghost with the Hammer in His Hand" and "The Tylorstown Terror" due to his bludgeoning punching power. While reigning as the world's greatest flyweight, Wilde would take on bantamweights and even featherweights, and knock them out. As well as his professional career, Wilde participated in 151 bouts judged as 'newspaper decisions', of these the results were: Won 7 and lost 1, with 143 being declared as 'no decisions'. Wilde has the third longest recorded unbeaten streak in boxing history, having gone 92–0–1. Behind Packey McFarland who went 106–1–6 losing only his 9th fight and going another 104 unbeaten and behind Young Griffo who was 7–1–3 early on and bringing his record up to 79–1–38 going 107 fights unbeaten.

Early years 
Jimmy Wilde's birth certificate states that he was born in the Taff Bargoed Valley community of Pentwyn Deintyr) (now known as the Graig), Quakers Yard, Treharris, Wales, in the county borough of Merthyr Tydfil. His parents later moved to the village of Tylorstown in the Rhondda Valley when Wilde was around 6 years old. In the 1901 census eight year old William James Wilde, his parents and his three sisters were all recorded as speaking only Welsh. His father was a coal miner and Jimmy later worked in the pits himself, being small enough to crawl through gullies impassable to most of his colleagues. He started boxing at the age of sixteen in fairground boxing booths, where crowds were amazed by his toughness and ability to knock down much larger opponents, most of whom were local men weighing around 200 lbs. In 1910, Wilde married his wife Elizabeth and was a father the same year. He left Tylorstown Colliery in 1913.

Professional career 
The record books often show that Wilde started boxing professionally in 1911, but it is widely assumed (and later confirmed by boxing analysts) that he had been fighting professionally for at least four years before that. His claim that he had at least 800 fights is probably greatly exaggerated, but it was certainly more than the 152 shown in Boxrec and elsewhere. His officially listed debut was on 26 December 1910, when he fought Les Williams to a no-decision in three rounds. His first win came on 1 January 1911, when he knocked out Ted Roberts in the third round

Managed by Teddy Lewis, reserve captain of the local rugby club, Pontypridd RFC, Wilde went undefeated in 103 bouts, all of which were held in Britain, a remarkable achievement. In the middle of that streak, on 31 December 1912, he won the British 7 stone championship by beating Billy Padden by an eighteenth-round knockout in Glasgow. He finally lost his undefeated record when he challenged Tancy Lee for the vacant British and Europe Flyweight Championship on 15 January 1915 in London. Wilde was knocked out in the seventeenth round (of twenty).

In 1915, Wilde was hospitalized, requiring an operation for "an internal complaint". After a sixteen-fight knockout streak, on 14 February 1916 he won the British flyweight title by beating Joe Symonds by a knockout in round twelve at the National Sporting Club in London. On 24 April 1916, Wilde beat Johnny Rosner by a knockout in the eleventh round at Liverpool Stadium to win the IBU World Flyweight title. On 13 May, he had two fights on the same day at Woolwich Dockyard (against Darkey Saunders and Joe Magnus), winning both by knockout, both fights combined lasting less than five rounds. On 26 June Wilde returned to the National Sporting Club to take his revenge on Tancy Lee with an eleventh-round knockout. On 18 December, Wilde became recognised as the first World Flyweight Champion (the IBU title was only recognised in Europe) when he defeated Young Zulu Kid of the United States, knocking him out in the eleventh round of their bout at the Holborn Stadium.

In late December 1916, after being rejected on two previous occasions due to an old leg problem from a colliery accident and for being underweight, Wilde was accepted into the British Army and while never seeing active service, became an instructor at Aldershot.

In 1917, he retained the world title by beating George Clarke by a knockout in four. With that win, he also won the European title and recovered the British title. But that would be his last title defence, as soon he decided to vacate the world title. He kept fighting and winning, and in 1919, he beat Joe Lynch, another boxer who was a world champion, by decision in 15.

Wilde travelled to the United States for a series of fights, and on 6 December 1919, lost to "Little" Jackie Sharkey in a ten-round newspaper decision of the Milwaukee Journal before a crowd close to 8,000 at the Auditorium in Milwaukee, Wisconsin.<ref>"English Bantam Champ Loses Popular Verdict to American, El Paso Herald, El Paso, Texas, pg. 12, 8 December 1919</ref> Sharkey was considered a decisive winner, taking eight of the ten rounds according to the newspapermen at ringside. Sharkey's blows were said to land more frequently and with greater force. Sharkey's win was at least a minor upset as Wilde led in the early betting 2 to 1."Yankee Wins Over Briton", The Daily Gate City and Constitution Democrat, Keokuk, Iowa, pg. 6, 8 December 1919

In 1920, Wilde went undefeated in 10 fights, but then, he lost by a knockout in 17 to former World Bantamweight Champion Pete Herman, who outweighed him by more than a stone (14 pounds), in 1921. The bout was originally scheduled as a title defence, but Herman had lost his championship to Lynch the month before. Herman easily regained the Bantamweight title from Lynch in July 1921, leading some to suspect that he had left the title behind with Lynch in America intentionally. That was the fight that marked his return to Britain after touring the United States all of 1920. After a win over Young Jennings, he announced his retirement.

Wilde returned to the ring out of a sense of obligation to defend his title against Pancho Villa on 18 June 1923 at the Polo Grounds in New York. After losing by a knockout in seven to the Philippines' first world champion, Wilde announced his retirement before returning to England, confirming his decision on 1 January 1924.

In 1927, at the age of 35, Wilde was reportedly considering making a comeback, but never returned to competitive boxing.

 Retirement 
Having had his first book, Hitting and Stopping: How I Won 100 Fights, published in 1914, Wilde wrote two additional books, the instructional The Art of Boxing (1923). and the 1938 autobiography Fighting Was My Business. 

Wilde's son David followed him into a career in professional boxing, although without great success.

In the 1930s he lived in a house in Hocroft Court, Cricklewood, from where almost all of his boxing trophies and medals were stolen in a 1936 burglary. He became a boxing referee, including in 1936 refereeing every bout of a boxing tournament at the Hastings Pier Pavilion. In December 1936 he was injured after being thrown from a car driven by a friend when it collided with a van near Hampstead.

Wilde lived the last few years of his life in the Cadoxton district of Barry, South Wales. With his final boxing winnings, Wilde entered into several business schemes, including a Welsh cinema chain and partnership in a cafe at 5 Western Shelter, Barry Island that was named 'The Mighty Atom' cafe. None were successful and he spent his final years in poverty. In 1965, Wilde suffered serious injuries during a mugging at a train station in Cardiff, from which he never recovered. His wife, Elizabeth, died in 1967, and two years later Wilde died in a hospital in Whitchurch. He was buried in Barry Cemetery.

 Awards and recognition 
With the longest unbeaten streak in boxing history, he went 103 fights before his first loss.   Wilde had a record of 139 wins, 3 losses, 1 draw and 5 no-contests, with an impressive 99 wins by knockout. Ring Magazine, named him both the 3rd greatest puncher of all time, and the greatest flyweight of all time, and rated him as the 13th greatest fighter of the 20th century.

In 1990, he was elected to the inaugural class of the International Boxing Hall of Fame and in 1992, the Welsh Sports Hall of Fame.

He was ranked as the top flyweight of all-time by the International Boxing Research Organization in 2006.

Professional boxing record
All information in this section is derived from BoxRec, unless otherwise stated. 
Official record

All newspaper decisions are officially regarded as “no decision” bouts and are not counted in the win/loss/draw column.

Unofficial record

Record with the inclusion of newspaper decisions in the win/loss/draw column.

 See also 

 List of Welsh boxing world champions

 Notes 

Further reading
Harris, Gareth (2006) Jimmy Wilde: World Champion Flyweight Boxer – Tylorstown Legend'', Coalopolis Publishing,

External links 
 
 Jimmy Wilde - CBZ Profile
 

|-

https://titlehistories.com/boxing/wba/wba-world-fl.html
https://titlehistories.com/boxing/na/usa/ny/nysac-fl.html

1892 births
1969 deaths
People from Treharris
Sportspeople from Merthyr Tydfil County Borough
People from Tylorstown
Sportspeople from Rhondda Cynon Taf
Welsh male boxers
Flyweight boxers
World boxing champions
World flyweight boxing champions
British Army personnel of World War I
International Boxing Hall of Fame inductees
European Boxing Union champions